The  San Diego Chargers season was the franchise's 28th season in the National Football League (NFL), its 38th overall and was the first season under Kevin Gilbride. With veteran first-string quarterback Stan Humphries missing half the season, the Chargers struggled and failed to improve on their 8–8 record from 1996. Backup quarterback Craig Whelihan went winless in seven starts, with the result that the Chargers lost their final eight games after a 4–4 start and scored only one touchdown in their final three games. The team finished with a 4–12 record and missed the playoffs for the second consecutive season.

San Diego struggled with Gilbride's new offensive system. Humphries posted a QB rating of 70.8, his worst as a Charger; none of the other three quarterbacks who saw action managed better than 60.6, and the number of sacks given up leapt from 33 to 51. Tony Martin was again the leading receiver, but fell short of 1,000 yards for the first time in three seasons. The running game improved slightly. Gary Brown gained 945 yards, but was inconsistent: his top two yardage totals were 181 and 169, but he only reached 60 yards in one other game. From San Diego's season tally of 27 touchdowns, only 17 were scored by the offense, a new club record low. Changes to the offensive line may have contributed to these struggles, with Eric Moten and Harry Swayne both having departed during the offseason.

On defense, linebacker Junior Seau led the team with 7.0 sacks. However, his six-season run as the top tackler was ended by Rodney Harrison, who had a superb all-round year at strong safety: 4.0 sacks, 132 tackles, touchdowns on an interception return, a fumble recovery and a kickoff return. New signing Eric Metcalf ran three punts back for touchdowns.

The team's stadium, Qualcomm Stadium, hosted Super Bowl XXXII at the end of the season.

Offseason

NFL Draft

Undrafted free agents

Personnel

Staff

Roster

Regular season

Schedule

Note: Intra-division opponents are in bold text.

Game Summaries

Week 1

For the second consecutive season, the Chargers took a beating from New England. Four touchdown passes from Drew Bledsoe had the Patriots cruising at halftime, up 31-0. Rookie tight end Freddie Jones made a fine one-handed grab for a 44-yard touchdown, but that was the lone Charger highlight. When Stan Humphries dislocated his shoulder trying to chase down a fumble, Jim Everett came in and threw a pick six to complete the scoring.

Week 2

Six takeaways by the Charger defense helped back-up QB Jim Everett beat the team who'd cut him during the offseason. In an error-filled game, San Diego went ahead when an errant pitch was missed by several players and chased back 30 yards into the Saints end zone, where Rodney Harrison recovered. Leading 13-6, Everett wasted an opportunity with a red zone interception, but found Freddie Jones with 2:10 to play for the clincher.

Week 3

Humphries returned to the starting line-up, and began well, hitting Tony Martin deep for 59 yards to set up a touchdown for Erric Pegram. However, the Panthers needed only five plays to level the scores, and took control from there. Humphries was sacked seven times, and accounted for three of four lost fumbles for San Diego on the day.

The seven sacks conceded were the worst for San Diego since a replacement players game during the 1987 season.

Week 4

The Chargers paid for an inability to score on offense, three times settling for field goals after driving inside the Seattle ten. Rodney Harrison scored the lone San Diego touchdown, jumping the route on a Warren Moon pass and going 75 yards untouched for a 10-3 lead. San Diego should have doubled that lead, but officials incorrectly ruled an Eric Metcalf touchdown as an incomplete pass, and they had to settle for the second of John Carney's five field goals.

Daryll Williams picked off Humphries three times, the most crucial coming in the third quarter, with San Diego in position to extend a 16-13 lead. A Terrence Shaw interception later led to a field goal, but Moon found Joey Galloway for a 51-yard touchdown to put Seattle ahead. Another Moon turnover, this time a fumble recovered by Harrison, set up Carney's fifth field goal, edging the Chargers ahead 22-20 with 5:21 to play. However, Seattle then drove 80 yards for the winning touchdown with 1:22 on the clock, San Diego failing to make a first down on their final possession.

Week 5

A trio of long touchdown passes brought the Chargers a much-needed win. Humphries connected Tony Martin for a 36-yard touchdown in the first quarter; after a Ravens field goal, Eric Metcalf's 62-yard reception had San Diego knocking on the door again, but Humphries threw an end zone interception. He soon made amends, finding Martin wide open behind the defense for a 72-yard score.

John Carney was out for the season with a knee injury; his replacement Greg Davis missed from 49 yards out midway through the second quarter, and the tide began to turn. Baltimore scored two field goals, a touchdown and a two-point conversion over their next three possessions, and led 17-14. The Chargers reached 1st and goal at the 6 in response, but Humphries again threw an interception. On their next possession, San Diego had a lucky break, the officials missing a fumble by Terrell Fletcher. On the very next play, the Humphries-to-Martin connection struck again from 38 yards out. 4th quarter interceptions by Mike Dumas and Dwayne Harper prevented a Ravens comeback.

Humphries finished on 17 of 26 for a career-high 358 yards, 3 touchdowns and 2 interceptions. Martin caught all three touchdowns, his first of the season, and gained 155 yards on just 4 receptions.

Week 6

Gary Brown and Greg Davis propelled San Diego to their 6th win in the past 7 road games against the Raiders. Three Davis field goals had the Chargers up 9-0 approaching halftime. A 36-yard pass interference penalty on Terrence Shaw then set the Raiders up with first and goal at the 1, but Jeff George missed on three passes, and Oakland had to settle for a field goal. It was 12-3 early in the second half before Napoleon Kaufman took a short pass from George and broke away for a 70-yard touchdown.

The Chargers soon restored their nine-point advantage. Brown broke off runs of 17 and 32 yards on the next drive, and finished it off with a 1 yard TD run. Seau later ended a threat by sacking George, forcing a fumble that John Parrella recovered, setting up the fifth of Davis' six field goals.

Brown, who had been out of the NFL since the Oilers cut him in 1995, finished on 186 yards from a career-high 36 carries.

Week 8

San Diego were dominated in their first Thursday night game for 11 seasons. Kansas City eased to a 24-0 lead at halftime, and a 26-yard Greg Davis field goal was all that prevented a shutout. Stan Humphries was knocked out of the game with a concussion in the 1st quarter, and backup Jim Everett threw a pair of interceptions before third-stringer Craig Whelihan finished up the game; between them, the trio had only 14 completions in 43 attempts. The Chargers also gave up 19 penalties for 146 yards, both of which set club records.

Week 9

The Chargers levelled their record at 4-4 with victory over the winless Colts. After four Davis field goals accounted for all the first half scoring, the game woke up in the 3rd quarter; Gary Brown broke off a 31-yard run to set up his own one-yard score, after a Colts reply, Stan Humphries threw the last touchdown pass of his career, a two-yarder to Frank Hartley. The Chargers were up 29-13 late on when Davis had his attempt at a sixth field blocked and run back for a touchdown; San Diego prevented a two-point conversion and Harrison then ran an onside kick attempt back 40 yards for a touchdown to complete the scoring.

Brown had 169 yards on 28 carries. It was the third time in the season San Diego scored five or more field goals, tying a dubious record set by the Minnesota Vikings eight seasons previously.

The result appeared more significant at the end of the season, as San Diego finished 4-12, while the Colts were 3-13, giving them the first pick in the 1998 NFL draft.

Week 10

San Diego lost both the game and their starting quarterback. They began well, with Gary Brown opening the scoring, and Eric Metcalf later making it 14-10 with an 85-yard punt return. A pair of Humphries errors turned the game in the 2nd quarter, an interception setting up one touchdown and a fumble being directly returned for another.

It was 24-17 to the Bengals in the 3rd quarter when Humphries was driven into the ground by Reinard Wilson, sustaining his second concussion in three games. This injury kept him out for the rest of the season, and he decided to retire early the next year.

With backup Jim Everett also out with an ankle injury, 3rd year pro Craig Whelihan came in for the rest of the game. The Bengals twice extended their lead to 14 points, and the Chargers pegged them back both times. Firstly, Metcalf ran another punt back for a score, this time from 67 yards out. Then Whelihan threw his first NFL touchdown pass, a 44-yarder to Charlie Jones. San Diego had two further possessions, but could not cross midfield.

It was the second time Metcalf had returned two kicks for scores in a single game. He became the first player to have ten total kick return touchdowns in a career (2 kickoffs, 8 punts).

Week 11

Craig Whelihan had some good moments in his first NFL start, but it wasn't enough for the win. Special team got the Chargers off to a fast start, Greg Jackson returning a fumbled punt for a touchdown. Whelihan then strung together 11 consecutive completions over three drives, including a 10-yard touchdown to Martin. A Davis field goal made it 17-3 late in the 2nd quarter.

Seattle responded with touchdown drives either side of halftime, then recovered a Whelihan fumble in the end zone for a 24-17 lead. Late in the third quarter, the tide turned again, when Paul Bradford picked off a Warren Moon pass and returned it 56 yards for a game-tying score. Early in the 4th quarter, Whelihan went deep for Martin, finding him from 61 yards out to put the Chargers back on top. However, Seattle came back once again, Moon's second touchdown pass coming between two field goals. San Diego's last chance ended when Whelihan was sacked on 4th and 6 from midfield.

The quarterback finished on 17 of 29 for 206 yards, 2 touchdowns and 1 interception. Martin caught 5 for exactly 100 yards, and the two scores.

Week 12

A lack of punch on offense saw San Diego lose at home to the Raiders for the fifth time in seven seasons. Their defense got them off to the ideal start, Greg Jackson picking off Jeff George and going 36 yards for his second touchdown in as many weeks. However, Oakland needed only four plays to level the scores; a Whelihan fumble set them up for a 14-7 lead. San Diego moved the ball well on their next two drives, but both times had to settle for field goals, while the Raiders added another touchdown. It was 21-13 at the break, and Oakland added 17 unanswered points in the second half.

Running back Harvey Williams had two touchdowns rushing and two receiving, becoming the first Charger opponent to score four in one game since 1985.

Week 13

Despite a feeble offensive showing (8 first downs, 3 turnovers), San Diego ran the 10-1 49ers surprisingly close. The Chargers failed to cross midfield in the first half, but the defense managed to keep a 49ers attack featuring future Hall of Famers Steve Young and Terrell Owens largely in check, and the score was only 10-0 at the break. Early in the second half, a fumbled punt return set the Chargers up in the red zone, but they could muster only a field goal. A Whelihan interception set San Francisco up for a short touchdown drive; the quarterback's next pass was also intercepted, but San Diego's defense kept them in the game, rookie defensive back Paul Bradford returning a Garrison Hearst fumble 78 yards for a touchdown.

Whelihan was benched at this point - he had gone 4 of 18 for 81 yards and three interceptions, with a 6.2 passer rating. Recently-acquired veteran Todd Philcox came on for this first action since 1993, and promptly led the Chargers on their only substantial drive of the game, moving from their own 20 to San Francisco territory, and seeming to have scored on a Bryan Still reception. However, a false start wiped out the score, and Davis missed a field goal a few plays later. San Diego had two more possessions, but could cross midfield on neither of them.

Week 14

San Diego lost to the division-leading Broncos in a game more one-sided than the final scoreline implied. Terrell Davis had 178 yards on the ground and 36 more through the air; he was the star performer as Denver moved serenely to a 35-14 lead early in the second half. Whelihan threw two picks, one being run back for a touchdown, but did manage to find Tony Martin for the receiver's 33rd and final touchdown as a Charger; Eric Metcalf provided another highlight when he went 83 yards for the record-breaking ninth punt return touchdown of his career.

Denver drove to the San Diego goal line, but turned the ball over on downs. The Chargers responded with an epic 25-play drive, covering 98 yards, featuring a pair of 4th down conversions and ending with Gary Brown's 1 yard run.

Following a failed onside kick attempt, Denver added a field goal. San Diego then had another long drive, this time covering 67 yards in 15 plays and scoring through a Metcalf reception. After a second onside kick was successful, the Chargers ran three more plays as time expired. This meant that San Diego had run 43 of the game's final 48 plays, having run only 30 out of 88 prior to that point. Their 25 plays on a single drive set an NFL record; they also tied the record for most plays in a single quarter, with 40 in the 4th.

Week 15

The Chargers actually outgained Atlanta 268-204, but were foiled by a handful of key plays. On the game's first drive, they had a 2nd and 11 at the Atlanta 16, but Terrell Fletcher couldn't handle a Whelihan pass, deflected off his hands and was intercepted. A second interception set up Atlanta for the opening touchdown, and they doubled their lead when Byron Hanspard went 99 yards with the opening kickoff of the second half. San Diego wasted opportunities on their three remaining drives: from a 1st and goal at the 6, they settled for a field goal; on 3rd and goal at the 3, Whelihan threw another interception; a 42 yard field goal attempt was blocked.

Metcalf had 109 yards on 8 receptions. The paid attendance was the lowest for a Charger home game since the 1992 season.

Week 16

As with the previous game, San Diego outgained the opposition - 282 yards to 239 this time - but floundered in opposition territory. After Whelihan found Metcalf to tie the scores at 7, six further Charger drives crossed midfield, but none produced points. Whelihan fumbled when sacked on a 3rd and 3 from the Kansas City 43, and was replaced by Todd Philcox, who was sacked by Derrick Thomas for a safety on his first drive. Later, with the score at 22-7, Philcox drove the team to a first down at the Chief 17, but threw a game-sealing pick six on the next play.

For the second time in the 1997 season, the Chargers gave up seven sacks.

Week 17

A forgettable defeat at the hands of the eventual Super Bowl champions closed out the Chargers' season. They took they lead with a Davis kick, and only trailed 7-3 when Junior Seau picked off a John Elway pass. However, Whelihan gave it straight back with an interception of his own, and it was already 31-3 a single play into the second half. The eight game losing streak was the club's worst in a single season since 1986.

Standings

References

San Diego Chargers
San Diego Chargers seasons
San Diego Chargers f